Superman: The Man of Tomorrow (MOT) is a comic book series published by DC Comics that ran for 16 issues from 1995 to 1999, featuring the adventures of Superman. At the time, the four Superman titles (Action Comics, The Adventures of Superman, Superman, and Superman: The Man of Steel) were released weekly with an intertwining story. The Man of Tomorrow was created to fill the extra week in months with five weeks. At about this time, however, DC began its fifth week events, disrupting the schedule of The Man of Tomorrow, which was subsequently canceled with issue #15.

Issue #1,000,000 of the series was a part of the "DC One Million" storyline, which was a top vote-getter for the Comics Buyer's Guide Fan Award for Favorite Story for 1999.

Key issues
 MOT #1: Return of Lex Luthor after being absent from the comics since Action Comics #701 (July 1994).
 MOT #5: Marriage of Luthor and Contessa Erica del Portenza.
 MOT #15: Day of Judgment cross-over. Superman has to rescue Lois Lane from Neron and Silver Banshee. Final issue.

References

External links
 Superman: The Man of Tomorrow at the Grand Comics Database
 

DC Comics titles
1996 comics debuts
Comics by J. M. DeMatteis
Comics by Louise Simonson
Comics by Roger Stern
Superman titles

de:Superman (Comicserien)#Superman: The Man of Tomorrow